Money Talks is the seventh studio album by Canadian rock band Trooper, released in 1982.

Track listing
(McGuire/Smith)

 3:37 - "Money Talks"
 3:09 - "Only a Fool"
 4:17 - "This Must Be the Place"
 4:04 - "Lookin' for Trouble"
 3:20 - "Ready for the Nite"
 3:41 - "Everything You Want"
 3:23 - "Could've Been Me"
 3:36 - "Any Minute Now"
 4:04 - "It Comes and It Goes"
 3:31 - "Dig a Little Deeper"

Band members

 Vocals - Ra McGuire
 Guitar - Brian Smith
 Drums - Tommy Stewart 
 Bass - Doni Underhill
 Keyboards - Rob Deans

Singles

 "Money Talks" / "Any Minute Now"
 "Could've Been Me" / "Dig a Little Deeper"
 "Only a Fool" / "Lookin' for Trouble"
 "Ready for the Nite" / "It Comes and It Goes"
 "This Must Be the Place" / "Money Talks"

References

Trooper (band) albums
1982 albums
Albums produced by Mike Flicker